Aníbal Pinto Garmendia (March 15, 1825June 9, 1884) was a Chilean political figure. He served as the president of Chile between 1876 and 1881.

Early life
He was born in Santiago de Chile, the son of former Chilean president General Francisco Antonio Pinto and of Luisa Garmendia Aldurralde. He completed his studies at the Colegio Argentino de Santiago and the Instituto Nacional. At the age of 20, he joined the foreign service, and was posted as under-secretary to the Chilean Legation to the Holy See. He returned to Chile two years later, in 1850. Two years later, he was elected to the lower house of congress, and was reelected several times. Later, he became a Senator and, in 1861, was named Intendant of Concepción, position that he held for 10 years. There he married Delfina de la Cruz Zañartu, daughter of General José María de la Cruz Prieto and Josefa Zañartu Trujillo.

In 1871, President Errázuriz named him minister of war and navy, and, from that position, became one of the contenders for the presidential nomination. He first defeated Miguel Luis Amunátegui in the liberal primaries, and later Benjamín Vicuña in the presidential elections.

Administration
His government started under the weight of the worst Chilean economic crisis of the 19th century. This was made worse by the floods of 1876, that laid waste to the nascent infrastructure. An earthquake on May 9, 1877, completed the destruction. At this juncture, he declared the non-convertibility of the currency, a measure that prevented a run on the banks and saved the public credit, but caused him the enmity of the opposition.

In 1878, he named Viña del Mar as a commune.

Nonetheless, the principal crisis of his administration was the outbreak of the War of the Pacific with Peru and Bolivia. He managed to successfully face the first onslaught, at the same time, achieving the all-important Argentinian neutrality. On July 23, 1881, he signed a treaty with Argentina recognising Argentine sovereignty on eastern Patagonia and Eastern Tierra del Fuego but keeping the Strait of Magellan and western Tierra del Fuego under Chilean control.

He also managed to obtain the capture of Antofagasta and Tarapacá and used these territories as new sources of revenue to finance the rest of the war.

Later life
After his retirement from politics, a debt that he had personally guaranteed forced him to sell all his property, having to move to a very modest house near Victoria square, in Valparaíso. Though he was offered the position of senator or different embassies in Europe, he decided to make do working as a translator for the railroad companies.  He died in Valparaíso in 1884.

References

External links

 Aníbal Pinto

1825 births
1884 deaths
People from Santiago
Chilean people of Portuguese descent
Chilean people of Basque descent
Liberal Party (Chile, 1849) politicians
Presidents of Chile
Chilean Ministers of Defense
Deputies of the X Legislative Period of the National Congress of Chile
Deputies of the XI Legislative Period of the National Congress of Chile
Deputies of the XIV Legislative Period of the National Congress of Chile
Deputies of the XV Legislative Period of the National Congress of Chile
Senators of the XVI Legislative Period of the National Congress of Chile
Senators of the XVII Legislative Period of the National Congress of Chile
Candidates for President of Chile
Chilean diplomats
Chilean Freemasons
Instituto Nacional General José Miguel Carrera alumni
Chilean people of the War of the Pacific